Dawa Harewa is a district located in the Oromia Zone of the Amhara region of Ethiopia. Dawa Harewa is bordered on the south by Artuma Fursi, on the west by Dawa Chaffa, on the northwest by the Argobba special woreda, on the northeast by Baati, and on the east by the Afar Region. Towns in Dawa Harewa include Bora. Dawa Harewa was part of former Chaffa Gola Dewerahmedo woreda.

Demographics
Based on the 2007 national census conducted by the Central Statistical Agency of Ethiopia (CSA), this woreda has a total population of 41,359, of whom 20,431 are men and 20,928 women; 1,706 or 4.13% are urban inhabitants. The majority of the inhabitants were Muslim, with 99.58% reporting that as their religion.

Notes

Districts of Amhara Region